Christopher Griffiths (born 3 September 1990), known as Chris Griffiths is an English field hockey player who plays as a forward for Old Georgians and the England and Great Britain national teams.

Club career
Griffiths plays club hockey in the Men's England Hockey League Premier Division for Old Georgians.

He joined East Grinstead in May 2014 ahead of the 2014-15 season.

He has also played for and captained Loughborough Students.

References

External links

1990 births
Living people
English male field hockey players
Male field hockey forwards
Field hockey players at the 2018 Commonwealth Games
Commonwealth Games medallists in field hockey
Commonwealth Games bronze medallists for England
Loughborough Students field hockey players
East Grinstead Hockey Club players
Men's England Hockey League players
Field hockey players at the 2020 Summer Olympics
Olympic field hockey players of Great Britain
Sportspeople from Birmingham, West Midlands
Medallists at the 2018 Commonwealth Games